Arctia churkini is a moth of the  family Erebidae. It was described by Saldaitis, Ivinskis and Witt in 2003 and is endemic to  Kyrgyzstan.

This species was formerly a member of the genus Acerbia, but was moved to Arctia along with the other species of the genera Acerbia, Pararctia, Parasemia, Platarctia, and Platyprepia.

References

Moths described in 2003
Endemic fauna of Kyrgyzstan
Arctiina
Moths of Asia